Reginald de Bugwell was Dean of Exeter between 1353 and 1363.

Notes

Deans of Exeter